Uwe Bracht (10 July 1953 – 11 November 2016) was a German professional footballer who played as a midfielder. He spent eleven seasons in the Bundesliga with SV Werder Bremen.

Bracht died in 2016 at the age of 63.

Honours
Werder Bremen
 Bundesliga runner-up: 1982–83

References

External links
 
 

1953 births
2016 deaths
German footballers
Footballers from Bremen
Association football midfielders
Bundesliga players
2. Bundesliga players
SV Werder Bremen players
VfB Oldenburg players